The Kossau is a stream in the district of Plön in eastern Schleswig-Holstein, Germany. It drains the lake  and flows past Lütjenburg and through the Großer Binnensee before entering the Baltic Sea near Hohwacht. The stream was dammed near  in the Middle Ages to form a lake which existed until the 18th century. It is largely in a natural state and, together with its wet meadows, forms a rich habitat. The Kossau Valley is a designated nature reserve.

See also 
List of rivers of Schleswig-Holstein

External links 
Holstein Switzerland Nature Park 

Rivers of Schleswig-Holstein
Plön (district)
 
Rivers of Germany